USS Anzio (CG-68) is a  guided missile cruiser that served in the United States Navy. She was named for the site of a beachhead invasion of Italy by Allied troops from 22 January to 23 May 1944. Her keel was laid down by the Litton-Ingalls Shipbuilding Corporation at Pascagoula, Mississippi on 21 August 1989. The ship was launched on 2 November 1990, and commissioned on 2 May 1992, under the command of Captain H. Wyman Howard, Jr. Anzio was decommissioned on 22 September 2022.

Etymology
The ship is named for the battle that took place at Anzio, Italy, the site of an Allied amphibious assault during Operation Shingle as part of the Italian Campaign of World War II. One other ship, an escort carrier decommissioned after World War II, shares her name.

History

2000s
In an unannounced missile test, the Israel Defense Forces fired a Jericho-1 medium-range ballistic missile from a test facility in Yavne, which landed  from the ship. The missile was detected by the ship's radar, and the crew briefly thought that they were under attack.

On 9 January 2003, Anzio was pre-deployed in support of Operation Iraqi Freedom. Ordered first to the eastern Mediterranean Sea for the initial phase of President George W. Bush's Shock and Awe strategy (during which the U.S. Navy deployed to defeat the Iraq military before ground forces were sent in). Once Anzio completed her mission in the eastern Mediterranean, she forward-deployed to the Persian Gulf. Once Anzio arrived in the Persian Gulf, she had marked her 45th straight day at sea. In the Persian Gulf, Anzio continued carrier-flight support operations and coastal surveillance. After President Bush announced major combat had concluded in the Iraq War, on 1 May 2003, Anzio was relieved of her duties, returning home on 3 July 2003, after 175 days at sea. In March 2003, she was assigned to Cruiser-Destroyer Group Eight.

In 2004, Anzio participated at the annual Fleet Week in New York City. In January 2007, the warship was sent to the coast of Somalia to conduct anti-terrorist operations as part of the USS Dwight D. Eisenhower task force.

On 16 February 2007, Anzio was awarded the 2006 Battle "E" award.

Anzio was anchored and a participant for 'Windjammer Days' in Boothbay Harbor, Maine from 25 to 26 June 2008.

Anzio has served as the flagship of the Horn of Africa international anti-piracy Combined Task Force 151. The boarding team destroyed the drugs by dumping them into the ocean and released the skiff's crew.

2010s
Anzio embarked Detachment 2 of Helicopter Maritime Strike Squadron 46 (HSM-46) for operations in 2012.

Anzio was tentatively scheduled to be decommissioned and designated for disposal on 31 March 2013. However, Anzio was retained under the National Defense Authorization Act for Fiscal Year 2013.

On 13 January 2016, ten U.S. Navy sailors were picked up by Anzio for transport and medical evaluations after being held in Iranian custody. The sailors were captured by Iran on 12 January 2016 after their two naval boats entered Iranian waters. "The evidence suggests that they unintentionally entered the Iranian waters because of the failure of their navigational system," Islamic Revolutionary Guard Corps spokesman Ramazan Sharif said on Press TV.

2020s
In December 2020 the U.S. Navy's Report to Congress on the Annual Long-Range Plan for Construction of Naval Vessels stated that the ship was planned to be placed Out of Commission in Reserve in 2022.

On 22 September 2022, Anzio was decommissioned at Naval Station Norfolk, Virginia after 30 years of service.

In popular culture
 Anzio is featured in the 2011 video game Ace Combat: Assault Horizon, where she partakes in an aerial battle over Washington D.C. before being sunk by Russian kamikaze pilots.
 Anzio is featured in the 1996 Tom Clancy novel Executive Orders, as part of a task force escorting transport ships to Saudi Arabia.
 Anzio is featured in Eric L. Harry's novel Arc Light, where she engages Russian ballistic missile submarines in the Kara Sea.

References

External links

 

 

1990 ships
Cruisers of the United States
Ships built in Pascagoula, Mississippi
Ticonderoga-class cruisers